Kalepalli is a village in the Indian state of Andhra Pradesh.

References 

Villages in Chittoor district